The RFL President's Cup is an annual competition for men's and women's representative teams drawn from the British Rugby league structure and is run by the Rugby Football League (RFL). It was previously known as the RFL Association's Cup.

History 
The RFL Associations Cup was founded in 2014 following the previous year's Rugby League Festival Of World Cups (the series of Rugby League World Cups for women, wheelchair, police, armed forces and students) with a view to better preparing each of the competing British entries ahead of their inclusion in future World Cups.

Speaking at the launch of the competition, David Gent, the RFL's Director of Participation stated "This competition is about a regular fixed competition for these associations, but it is vital we support these squads in their attempts to win their respective World Cups." 

Additional benefits for the women's team would be to give  selectors the opportunity to scout players from all sections of the women's game, to create higher intensity fixtures than the domestic competition at the time provided and to select players to the national women's squad.

The first season saw the men's competition involving Great Britain Students, Great Britain Armed Forces, Great Britain Teachers and Great Britain Police and the women's competition featuring England Students, Great Britain Armed Forces, Great Britain Teachers and The Lionesses - a team made up of players from the women's domestic league who were not eligible for any of the other three teams.

In 2015 England Universities replaced Great Britain Students in the men's competition following the movement of the Student Rugby League Four Nations Competition from the Easter period to a summer slot.

No men's or women's competition took place in 2017 owing to teams participating in the Festival of World Cups in Australia. During this year, Great Britain Armed Forces re-branded to become UK Armed Forces.

For the 2018 season, the competition was renamed RFL President's Cup.  The women's competition was discontinued following the RFL revamping the international player pathway process and introducing a National Performance Programme with a focus on talent identification, player skill development, physical competences and the creation of a performance coaching environment in advance of the RFL opening a National Rugby League Centre in Manchester which will provide facilities for the England Women's team to train at. An Origin Game was also introduced to recreate international competition to develop the elite players.

The 2020 and 2021 seasons were cancelled as a result of the Covid-19 global pandemic, but the competition returned in 2022 which also saw the return of a women's competition, this time for only 3 teams; England Students, Great Britain Teachers and UK Armed Forces.

Format 
Each team plays each other once in a single round-robin competition, with the team finishing at the top of the league table being crowned champions.

Competition points are scored as follows:

 Win: 2 points
 Draw: 1 point
 Loss: 0 points
 Default on game: 0 points (with 24-0 score-line awarded to the opposition).

Where teams are tied on competition points, points difference (the cumulative number of points scored in all games minus the cumulative number of points conceded in all games) is used to determine league positions.

The Pankhurst Trophy, previously played for annually and awarded to the winner of the England Students v UK Armed Forces women's game, continues to be awarded to the winner of the fixture.

Men's Competition

2022 season 
The fixtures for the 2022 season are:

2021 season 
Competition did not take place.

2020 season 
Competition did not take place.

2019 season 
The fixtures for the 2019 season are:

2018 season 
Fixtures & results:

2017 season 
Competition did not take place.

2016 season 
Fixtures & results:

2015 season 
Fixtures & results:

2014 season 
Fixtures & results:

Women's Competition

2022 season 
Fixtures & results:

2016 season 
Fixtures & results:

2015 season 
Fixtures & results:

2014 season 
Fixtures & results:

References

External links 

University Rugby League

Teachers Rugby League Association
UK Armed Forces Rugby League

Rugby league competitions in the United Kingdom
2014 establishments in the United Kingdom